The discography of Laleh, an Iranian-born Swedish singer-songwriter contains nine studio albums and three extended plays.

Laleh first appeared on Swedish charts in early 2005 with the single "Invisible (My Song)" which instantly reached the top ten in the country's chart. Until 2011, this was her only release to chart within the top ten, despite her most successful single to date in terms of sales being "Live Tomorrow", also released in 2005. This song also managed to chart at number eleven in Denmark, her only song to chart outside of Sweden. Her self-titled debut album was released in March 2005 and found extended chart success, peaking at number one and enjoying a resurgence in sales following the release of "Live Tomorrow".

Her follow-up album, Prinsessor, was released a year later and peaked at number three in the charts. The album saw the release of a further four songs, all of which failed to chart on the Sverigetopplistan. After taking a three-year break, Laleh returned with her third effort, Me and Simon, which peaked at number two in the Swedish album chart and yielded three charting singles, "Snö", "Simon Says" and "Big City Love". In 2011, Laleh took part in Swedish reality show Så mycket bättre, which saw four covers she performed chart on the Sverigetopplistan. In 2012 she released her fourth studio album, Sjung, which was preceded by the single "Some Die Young" and included "Vårens första dag".

Albums

Studio albums

Live albums

Video albums

Extended plays

Singles

As lead artist

Notes

As featured artist

Notes

Other charted songs

Notes

Production discography

Music videos

Other appearances

References 

Discographies of Swedish artists
Pop music discographies
Folk music discographies